Cannington Greyhounds is a greyhound racing venue on Station Street and Grey Street near Albany Highway in Cannington, Western Australia. The venue is owned and operated by the Western Australian Greyhound Racing Association (WAGRA). Race meetings take place most Monday, Wednesday and Saturday nights and some Sundays.

History 
Canning Greyhound Racing Association was granted a licence on 18 September 1973 to host greyhound racing. In January 1974 construction of the first metropolitan track in Western Australia commenced at the Canning Agricultural Society Showgrounds on Station Road adjacent to Albany Highway. Consisting of a 5,000 capacity stand and tiered grandstand restaurant, a $150,000 indicator board, $85,000 kennel block, seven bars and fast food outlets, and 100 totalisator outlets, the project cost $1.8 million. Upon completion, the venue was named Cannington Central.

The first race meeting was held on 12 December 1974, comprising eight races with an attendance of over 15,000 people. The first race winner was a greyhound called David Volo, trained by Sammy Blackburn in a time of 32.54 seconds.

In 1981 legislation was passed under the Western Australia Greyhound Racing Association Act that transferred the assets and liabilities of the Canning Greyhound Racing Association to the WAGRA.

In April 1989 Cannington Greyhounds switched to a sand-based track with the first race on sand being run on 22 April 1989. The next upgrade was to an above ground lure system, which was first used at Cannington Greyhounds on 21 January 2001. The track hosted the AGRA National Championships in 1984, 1993, 1998, 2004, 2009, 2014 and 2019. In total, WAGRA has won the National Distance Championships three times with greyhound Paradise Street winning at Cannington Greyhounds in 1998, greyhound Miata winning in Hobart in 2012 and greyhound Reidy's Runner at Cannington Greyhounds in 2029.

2015 relocation 
In 2014 a new venue was proposed to be built adjacent to the original venue. On 27 June 2015 the final race was held at the original venue, with greyhound All Strung Out trained by Chris Halse winning the last race in 30.72 seconds. A Bunnings Warehouse now occupies the site of the original venue.

Greyhound Glass Cutter trained by Enzo Crudelli won the first race in a time of 30.67 seconds. The venue features the Box 1 Bar & Restaurant and hosts major races including the Perth Cup and Perth Galaxy.

Track Records 1974–2015

Records on the original track.

Current Track Records 

Records on the new track, .

Top Runs

Major races 
Every year Cannington host the Group 1 Perth Cup and Galaxy.

Perth Cup

Roll of Honour

Perth Cup records
 Largest Winning Margin Sand Pebble - 10 3/4 Lengths
 Race Record High Earner - 29.97
 Race Record Vice Grip - 29.42
 Smallest Winning Margin Ima Wagtail - Nose
 Oldest Winner Wynlee Supreme - 50 months

Galaxy

Roll of Honour

Galaxy records

Feature races 

Apart from the Group 1 Galaxy and Perth Cup, Cannington Greyhounds also runs a number of feature races throughout the year at the venue.

References

Greyhound racing venues in Australia
Sports venues in Perth, Western Australia
Cannington, Western Australia